Sally Ann McGrath, aged 22, who lived with her parents in Tower Street, Peterborough, England, was last seen in Cathedral Square, Peterborough at 2.45pm on 11 July 1979, after telling friends at The Bull Hotel that she was heading to the unemployment office on Church Street. She was found murdered in 1980. After a series of cold case reviews, 59-year-old Paul Taylor was convicted of her murder in 2012 and for three rapes and other sexual offences against three other women committed in the months leading up to the murder.

1970s investigation
Her disappearance sparked a huge investigation that lasted into the 1980s and saw over 3,000 people interviewed by a murder squad based at Peterborough's Thorpe Wood police station, who took around 10,000 statements. No arrests were made at the time. On 1 March 1980, her badly decomposed body was found by gamekeeper Keith Dickenson while he was hunting rabbits. The corpse was partly hidden in dense woodland known as Wild Boar Spinney, near Castor and Ailsworth, about 3 miles north-west of Peterborough city centre. A post-mortem found that her body had been there for between three and six months and that she had suffered two head fractures and a broken nose. A police search of the area yielded no new clues.

2011 developments
On 9 October 2011, 59-year-old Paul Taylor was charged with murdering her. Taylor, of Valentine Close, Fareham, Hampshire, was also charged with three counts of rape, a sexual assault and an indecent assault in 1979. He appeared at Peterborough Magistrates' Court on 10 October 2011. The arrest followed a cold-case review into the death of Miss McGrath and seven other linked offences, codenamed Operation Highfields, which had started in 2009. On 4 December 2012, Paul Taylor was convicted of her murder along with crimes against three other women – crimes including rape, attempted rape and serious sexual assault. He was sentenced on 5 December 2012 and received life imprisonment with a minimum term of 18 years.

See also
List of solved missing person cases

References

1970s missing person cases
1979 in England
1979 murders in the United Kingdom
English rapists
Female murder victims
Formerly missing people
Murder in England
Rape in England
Violence against women in England